The Maryland Correctional Institution - Jessup is a medium security state prison for men located in Jessup, Anne Arundel County, Maryland.  It opened in 1981, first as an Annex to the state House of Correction and then as a separate facility, and holds a maximum of 1068 male inmates at medium security.

The facility is immediately across the street from Jessup Correctional Institution (JCI) and Dorsey Run Correctional Facility  (DRCF)

References

Prisons in Maryland
Buildings and structures in Anne Arundel County, Maryland
1981 establishments in Maryland